The 2017 Barcelona FIA Formula 2 round was a pair of motor races held on 13 and 14 May 2017 at the Circuit de Barcelona-Catalunya in Montmeló, Catalonia, Spain as part of the FIA Formula 2 Championship. It was the second round of the 2017 FIA Formula 2 Championship and was run in support of the 2017 Spanish Grand Prix.

Report

Background 
The Catalunya round marked the second round of the season and the first to be staged within the European continent. Following the previous round in Bahrain, Charles Leclerc entered the second round as the championship leader, with Artem Markelov and Oliver Rowland in second ad third respectively. Campos Racing announced a driver-change for the Catalunya round, with former-Formula 1 driver, Roberto Merhi replacing Stefano Coletti after only one outing for the Monégasque driver. This turned out to be a one-off for Merhi, although he later returned to race with the Rapax team.

Pirelli supplied the field with P Zero Orange hard tyres and P Zero Yellow soft tyres for the round. The abrasive surface as well as the demanding nature of the track meant that tyres played a vital role in the races - as much as they did in the previous round in Bahrain.

Practice and qualifying 
The conditions for practice were optimal, opening the door for fast lap times. Leclerc topped the timing sheets in free practice with a time of 1:29.974, followed closely by former teammate, Alexander Albon. Albon completed a time just 0.042 of a second off of Leclerc and given the strong performance in pre-season testing, looked set for an equally strong weekend ahead. In third was another debutant in Sergio Sette Camara, who was half a second off of Leclerc.

The immaculate conditions remained for the qualifying session, where Leclerc took his second pole position in succession. Jordan King set the initial benchmark with Nyck de Vries right behind him. As time went in qualifying, the times started to tumble until eventually Luca Ghiotto set a time of 1:29.478 to go fastest and seemed sure to be the pole position time. Elsewhere around the track, Artem Markelov's fire extinguisher let loose in his car, hampering his run and Nabil Jeffri ground to a halt, owing problems with his car. This subsequently brought out the red flag with six minutes remaining. Once the session resumed, the remainder of the field looked forward to eclipse Ghiotto's time. Alexander Albon improved his time to take fourth, but Leclerc went purple in the final two sectors to go two-tenths faster than Ghiotto and take the pole position for the second time in succession.

Races

Feature Race 
Leclerc led into turn one, but found himself under fire from Ghiotto and Albon after locking up. Ghiotto lunged down the inside into turn four, but couldn't make the move stick. The battle ensued for the next few corners as Leclerc struggled to maintain a rhythm following the lock-up. Artem Markelov and Antonio Fuoco came together at the end of the first sector which caused damage to Fuoco's front wing. He along with Johnny Cecotto came in for an early pitstop owing to damage brought on in the opening laps after having run into the back of Louis Deletraz at the end of the opening lap. Leclerc began to pull away from Ghiotto, who began to fall into the clutches of Albon, who subsequently made a move into turn one and took second place from Ghiotto. Leclerc pitted on lap seven, along with Matsushita, leaving Albon with the lead of the race. Canamasas ground to a halt on lap 10 owing to problems with the car. Despite this, he did not pull off the track to retire - instead remaining on the track and gesturing to the marshals asking for a push-start. The dangerous position of the car initially brought out the virtual safety car and eventually, the safety car itself. Eventually, the mercurial Spaniard conceded defeat and retired from the race. As the race resumed, Leclerc and Ghiotto began to scythe through the pack. Rowland eventually pressured Albon into a mistake to take the lead of the race, although both still had an impending pitstop to make. Eventually, the leaders made their stops, handing the lead once again to Leclerc. With the fresh rubber, Albon and Rowland were staging a comeback with both drivers challenging for the podium toward the latter stages of the race. Rowland gained on the third-placed Matsushita and eventually passed him on the main straight with use of DRS. Jordan King and Artem Markelov engaged in an epic battle for eighth spot which ultimately saw Markelov prevail to take the spot and pole position for the sprint race. For Charles Leclerc though, the win was rather comfortable and proved once again that he and the Prema outfit looked to be the team to beat for this years championship.

Sprint Race 
Nicholas Latifi made a blinder and shot through to the lead heading into turn one. Ralph Boschung stalled on the grid and contact between Nyck de Vries and Antonio Fuoco brought out the safety car before the end of the first lap. As the race resumed, Latifi maintained a relatively comfortable lead as the race remained stagnant for some laps. After a lock-up from Malja, Matsushita took second place and proceeded to pursue Latifi, whilst Rowland passed him further down the circuit. After battling for a number of laps, Leclerc finally passed Albon for fifth place and soon thereafter passed Malja for fourth. Latifi seemed to have had the race wrapped up until lap 22 when he ran wide and speared off into the gravel. He recovered and got back on track, but not before Matsushita passed him for the lead. His teammate Rowland passed him further down the circuit, as well. Matsushita remained in the lead and took his first win of the season, with the DAMS pair of Rowland and Latifi taking the remaining slots on the podium.

Classifications

Qualifying

Feature Race 

Notes
1. – Ralph Boschung and Johnny Cecotto Jr. received 20-second penalties after having been deemed to have insufficiently slowed for the VSC (Virtual Safety Car).
2. – Sérgio Sette Câmara was handed a five-second time penalty during the race. Having failed to take the penalty earlier in the race, an additional five-second penalty was given.

Sprint Race

Championship standings after the round

Drivers' Championship standings

Teams' Championship standings

 Note: Only the top five positions are included for both sets of standings.

References

External links 
 

Catalunya
Formula 2
Formula 2
Formula 2